Swayne & Hoyt Lines was an American steamship company based in San Francisco, California, and in operation from at least the 1890s to the late 1930s. The company was formed by Robert H. Swayne, and John G. Hoyt in 1890.

History

Swayne & Hoyt was engaged in trade with Japan by 1896, when the company was recorded as protesting duties assessed on ceramic goods it had imported in February 1896.

In the years after World War I, Swayne & Hoyt was engaged in the tramp trade with leased United States Shipping Board (USSB) ships but later evolved into a scheduled cargo line.

In 1926, the company was operating the American-Australian-Orient Line which sailed to Australia, New Zealand, and Asian ports. Also in the mid-1920s, Swayne & Hoyt was engaged in trade between Pacific ports and the east coast of South America.

By the late 1930s, Swayne & Hoyt was engaged in intercoastal shipping between U.S. ports on the Gulf of Mexico and on ports on the Pacific coast via the Panama Canal. Swayne & Hoyt v. United States challenged the legality of an order of the Secretary of Commerce to cease offering 6-month contracts to clients at a reduced rate if the clients only use the same shipping company for all their shipping during that period. The case was dismissed on the ground that Section 16 of the Shipping Act of 1916 forbids preferential treatment of any kind and that the arrangement violates unrestricted competition and furthers the establishment of a monopoly. The court conceded though that the arrangement had benefits to both the suing shipowners and their clients.

In June 1932, The Log, reported that Tirey L. Ford, Jr., Executive Vice-President of Swayne & Hoyt, Ltd., visited Puget Sound in connection with a proposed "rebuilding of the Swayne & Hoyt Gulf Pacific Mail Line ships Point Ancha and Ossining, which would operate under mail contract between Pacific Coast ports and ports of South America, the West Indies, and the Gulf."

Robert H. Swayne died 8 August 1936.

On February 26, 1940, the Pacific Shipper said that Tirey L. Ford, Vice President of Swayne & Hoyt, announced that the company would retire from business after 90 years leading steamship companies.

Fleet 

Ships that were owned by Swayne & Hoyt.

 Redondo
 4 ships of 3,500dwt
 built by Albina Engine & Machine Works
 all originally owned by the Pacific Mail Steamship Company in the early 20s
 sold by (unspecified) to Hammond Lumber in 1923,  these 2 Points are a false positive
 Point Adams, Astoria
 Point Bonita, San Pedro
 sold by Swayne & Hoyt to McCormick SS Co. in 1929
 Point Judith, Charles L. Wheeler, Jr.
 Point Lobos, Ernest H. Meyer
 7 ships of 5,500dwt
 all built by the Submarine Boat Corporation
 bought from the USSB in 1926 by Swayne&Hoyt
 Bound Brook, Point Bonita
 Continental Bridge, Point Fermin 
 , Point Reyes
 East Chicago, Point Sur 
 bought from the USSB (FY27) by Swayne&Hoyt 
 Federal Bridge, Point Montara
 bought from the USSB (FY28) by Gulf Pacific Line
 Neshobee, Point Gorda
 Riverside Bridge, Point Arena 
 13 ships of 7,500dwt
 built by Todd Tacoma
 Point Lobos (Ossining)
 Point Judith (Remus)
 Point Estero (Red Hook)
 Point Vincente (Hoboken)
 Point Clear (Pallas)
 Point Ancha (Delight)
 Point Bonita (Sacramento)
 built by Downey
 Point Brava (Manhatten or Osakis)
 Point Caleta (Dio)
 Point Chico (Abron)
 Point Palmas (Sabotawan)
 Point Salinas (Dochet)
 (one missing)

In February 1940 the Point Bonita, Point Arena, Point Judith (then located in the Gulf) and Point Clear, Point Ancha, Point Lobos (then on the West Coast) were sold to the Greek steamship operator A. G. Pappadakis.

Lines

Pacific Caribbean Gulf Line

Alvarado, Eldorado.

Pacific Argentine Brazil Line

Established in 1920, first announced in May, to be on a monthly schedule, through the Magellan Strait and return through the Panama Canal or this route in reverse.

Seattle - San Francisco - San Pedro - Magellan Strait - Buenos Aires - Montevideo - Santos - Panama Canal - San Pedro - San Francisco - Seattle

Swayne & Hoyt was classified as a Class 8 manager and/or operator (25,000 to 49,999 dwt) by the USSB in 1920, with 32,600dwt (2 * 7,500 + 2 * 8,800 = 32,600). Barber SS Lines was the largest at that time, Class No. 2 with 344,187dwt and there was a total of 42 Class 8 operators managing 1,437,336dwt worth of USSB-owned ships.

Pacific Australia Line

Las Vegas (Los Angeles SB), Vinita (Long Beach SB), West Cahokia (Western P&S), West Islip (Ames), Hollywood (Southwestern), all owned by the USSB.

Notes

References 

 

Defunct shipping companies of the United States
Companies based in San Francisco
Defunct companies based in California
Ship chartering